Querín is a surname. Notable people with the surname include:

Federico Querín (born 1966), Argentine rower
Leonardo Facundo Querín (born 1982), Argentine handball player